Glory Defined: The Best of Building 429 is an album by Christian rock band Building 429, which was released on June 3, 2008, through Word Records. This recording is the band's first compilation album.

Track listing

References

Building 429 albums
2008 greatest hits albums